The Netherlands has a rail network totalling  of track, or 3,013 route km. Three quarters of it is electrified, one third is single track. Railway lines are built in standard gauge, apart from a few narrow gauge industrial and recreational railways.

List of railway lines by province 
In contrast with the motorways in the Netherlands, and the railway lines in Belgium, the railway lines in the Netherlands are not identified by line numbers.  For that reason, the lines listed below are named simply by reference to the names of their termini.

Groningen 
 Groningen–Delfzijl railway
 Harlingen–Nieuweschans railway
 Ihrhove–Nieuweschans railway
 Meppel–Groningen railway
 Sauwerd–Roodeschool railway
 Stadskanaal–Zuidbroek railway

Friesland 
 Arnhem–Leeuwarden railway
 Harlingen–Nieuweschans railway
 Leeuwarden–Stavoren railway

Drenthe 
 Arnhem–Leeuwarden railway
 Gronau–Coevorden railway
 Meppel–Groningen railway
 Zwolle–Emmen railway

Overijssel 
 Almelo–Salzbergen (D) railway
 Apeldoorn–Deventer railway
 Arnhem–Leeuwarden railway
 Deventer–Almelo railway
 Doetinchem–Hengelo railway
 Dortmund–Enschede railway
 Lelystad–Zwolle railway (Hanzelijn)
 Mariënberg–Almelo railway
 Utrecht–Kampen railway
 Zutphen–Glanerbeek railway
 Zwolle–Almelo railway
 Zwolle–Emmen railway

Flevoland 
 Lelystad–Zwolle railway (Hanzelijn)
 Weesp–Lelystad railway (Flevolijn)

Gelderland 
 Amsterdam–Arnhem railway
 Amsterdam–Zutphen railway
 Apeldoorn–Deventer railway
 Arnhem–Nijmegen railway
 Arnhem–Leeuwarden railway
 Dieren–Apeldoorn railway
 Elst–Dordrecht railway
 Kesteren–Amersfoort railway
 Nijmegen–Kleve railway
 Nijkerk–Ede-Wageningen railway
 Nijmegen–Venlo railway
 Oberhausen–Arnhem railway
 Rotterdam–Zevenaar railway
 Tilburg–Nijmegen railway
 Utrecht–Boxtel railway
 Utrecht–Kampen railway
 Winterswijk–Zevenaar railway
 Zutphen–Glanerbeek railway

Utrecht 
 Amsterdam–Arnhem railway
 Amsterdam–Zutphen railway
 Den Dolder–Baarn railway
 De Haar–Rhenen railway
 Harmelen–Breukelen railway
 Hilversum–Lunetten railway
 Kesteren–Amersfoort railway
 Utrecht–Boxtel railway
 Utrecht–Rotterdam railway
 Utrecht–Kampen railway
 Woerden–Leiden railway

North Holland 
 Aalsmeer–Amsterdam Willemspark railway
 Amsterdam–Zutphen railway
 Amsterdam–Arnhem railway
 Amsterdam–Haarlem–Rotterdam railway
 Amsterdam–Schiphol railway
 Haarlem–Uitgeest railway
 Haarlem–Zandvoort railway
 Heerhugowaard–Hoorn railway
 Hilversum–Lunetten railway
 Hoorn–Medemblik railway
 Den Helder–Amsterdam railway
 HSL-Zuid
 Santpoort Noord–IJmuiden railway
 Weesp–Leiden railway
 Weesp–Lelystad railway (Flevolijn)
 Zaandam–Enkhuizen railway

South Holland 
 Amsterdam–Haarlem–Rotterdam railway
 Breda–Rotterdam railway
 Elst–Dordrecht railway
 Gouda–Alphen aan den Rijn railway
 Gouda–Den Haag railway
 HSL-Zuid
 Rotterdam–Zevenaar railway
 Schiedam–Hoek van Holland railway
 Utrecht–Rotterdam railway
 Weesp–Leiden railway
 Woerden–Leiden railway
 Havenspoorlijn

Zeeland 
 Gent–Terneuzen railway
 Lewedorp–Vlissingen Sloehaven railway
 Mechelen–Terneuzen railway
 Roosendaal–Vlissingen railway

North Brabant 
 Antwerp–Lage Zwaluwe railway
 Boxtel–Büderich railway
 Breda–Eindhoven railway
 Breda–Rotterdam railway
 Eindhoven–Weert railway
 HSL-Zuid
 Nijmegen–Venlo railway
 Roosendaal–Breda railway
 Roosendaal–Vlissingen railway
 Tilburg–Nijmegen railway
 Utrecht–Boxtel railway
 Venlo–Eindhoven railway

Limburg 
 Eindhoven–Weert railway
 Heerlen–Schin op Geul railway
 Liège–Maastricht railway
 Maastricht–Hasselt railway
 Maastricht–Aachen railway
 Maastricht–Venlo railway
 Nijmegen–Venlo railway
 Schaesberg–Simpelveld railway
 Sittard–Herzogenrath railway
 Venlo–Eindhoven railway
 Viersen–Venlo railway
 Weert–Roermond railway

Stretches with four tracks
 5 Schiphol – Hoofddorp
 5, 7 Leiden – Rijswijk
 7 Schiedam – Dordrecht
 13, 20 Amsterdam Centraal – Amsterdam Muiderpoort
 13 Amsterdam Bijlmer Arena – Utrecht Centraal
 9, 12 Boxtel – Eindhoven
 15, 16, 19 Utrecht Centraal – Utrecht Overvecht
 18 Utrecht – Woerden
 18 Gouda – Gouda Goverwelle

Former railways
The railways in the following list have been closed and demolished:
 Aalsmeer–Haarlem railway
 Aalsmeer–Nieuwersluis-Loenen railway
 Apeldoorn–Zwolle railway
 Assen–Stadskanaal railway
 Boekelo–Oldenzaal railway
 Bovenkerk–Uithoorn railway
 De Bilt–Zeist railway
 Deventer–Ommen railway
 Enschede–Ahaus railway
 Glanerbrug–Losser railway
 Groningen–Weiwerd railway
 Haltern–Venlo railway
 Hattem–Kampen Zuid railway
 Hoofddorp–Leiden Heerensingel railway
 Leeuwarden–Anjum railway
 Neede–Hellendoorn railway
 St. Pancras–Broek op Langedijk railway
 Stiens–Harlingen railway
 Tzummarum–Franeker railway
 Uithoorn–Alphen aan den Rijn railway
 Varsseveld–Dinxperlo railway
 Winsum–Zoutkamp railway
 Winterswijk–Neede railway
 Zevenaar–Kleve railway
 Zuidbroek–Delfzijl railway

History
Railway map 1904:

External links
 List of current rail service interruptions

References

Netherlands

Lines